2011 was a year on the Gregorian calendar.

2011 may also refer to:

 2011 (album), by the Smithereens
 "2011", a 2021 song by 5 Seconds of Summer